Ethel Wright Nesbitt (June 24, 1884 – November 7, 1958) was an American actress and teacher.

Wright was born in Mineral Point, Wisconsin, the second of three daughters born to lawyer Samuel Wright and his wife Catherine J Wright. All four of her grandparents were born in England. She had an older sister, Edna Wright, who was an activist and suffragette, and a younger sister, Rowe Wright, who was a magazine and book editor.

Wright appeared in several silent films, including as Marguerite Leonard in A Leap for Love (1912), the working mother in The Cry of the Children (1912), the bank teller's wife in Vengeance Is Mine (1912), Catherine Wolff in Bolshevism on Trial (1919) and Mrs. Minnett in The Enchanted Cottage (1924).

In addition to acting, Wright was a high school teacher. She married mechanical engineer Hugh Nesbitt from New Jersey on June 12, 1915, in Milwaukee. From 1920 to 1945, she was principal of the Professional Children's School in New York City.

She died in New Jersey in 1958.

References

External links 

 

1880s births
1958 deaths
American silent film actresses
20th-century American actresses
People from Mineral Point, Wisconsin
Actresses from Wisconsin
American people of English descent